The Principle of Hope is a book by the Marxist philosopher Ernst Bloch, published in three volumes in 1954, 1955, and 1959, in which the author explores utopianism, studying the utopian impulses present in art, literature, religion and other forms of cultural expression, and envisages a future state of absolute perfection. The Principle of Hope has become fundamental to dialogue between Christians and Marxists.

Background
Originally written between 1938 and 1947 in the United States, an enlarged and revised version of The Principle of Hope was published successively in three volumes in 1954, 1955, and 1959. Bloch, who had emigrated to the United States in 1938, returned to Europe in 1949 and became a Professor of Philosophy in East Germany. Despite having initially supported the regime, Bloch came under attack for his philosophical unorthodoxy and support for greater cultural freedom in East Germany, and publication of The Principle of Hope was delayed for political reasons.

Reception
The philosopher Leszek Kołakowski calls The Principle of Hope Bloch's magnum opus, writing that it contains all his important ideas. The work has been described as "monumental" by the philosopher Robert S. Corrington and the psychoanalyst Joel Kovel.

References

1954 non-fiction books
1955 non-fiction books
1959 non-fiction books
Books by Ernst Bloch
Contemporary philosophical literature
German-language books
German non-fiction books
Marxist works
Social philosophy literature
Philosophy of religion literature
Utopian theory